Maxim Gulin (born 16 May 1997, Kopeysk, Chelyabinsk Oblast) is a Russian political figure and a deputy of the 8th State Duma.
 
After graduating from the Plekhanov Russian University of Economics, Gulin worked as a junior regional development manager at the Charitable Foundation for Support of Educational Programs KAPITANY, founded by the leader of the New People party Alexey Nechayev. In February 2021, he was the secretary of the Chelyabinsk branch of the New People. Since September 2021, he has served as deputy of the 8th State Duma.

Sanctions
In December 2022 the EU sanctioned Maksim Gulin in relation to the 2022 Russian invasion of Ukraine.

References
 

 

1997 births
Living people
New People politicians
21st-century Russian politicians
Eighth convocation members of the State Duma (Russian Federation)
People from Chelyabinsk Oblast